Rhododendron subsection Tsutsusi is a subsection  of the genus Rhododendron, in section Tsutsusi, subgenus Azaleastrum, consisting of 66 species of Azaleas.

Description 
Leaves generally deciduous but some apical leaves over winter and are dimorphic, young twigs with flattened multicellular hairs that are widely distributed.

Taxonomy 
For etymology, see section Tsutsusi.

Species 
Selected species include;

 Rhododendron breviperulatum
 Rhododendron eriocarpum
 Rhododendron indicum
 Rhododendron kaempferi
 Rhododendron kiusianum
 Rhododendron mucronatum
 Rhododendron nakaharae
 Rhododendron oldhamii
 Rhododendron rubropilosum
 Rhododendron scabrum
 Rhododendron serpyllifolium
 Rhododendron simsii
 Rhododendron stenopetalum
 Rhododendron subsessile
 Rhododendron tosaense
 Rhododendron tschonoskii
 Rhododendron tsusiophyllum
 Rhododendron yedoense

References

Bibliography 
 Loretta Goetsch, Andrew Eckert and Benjamin Hall. Classification of genus Rhododendron.  2005 Annual ARS Convention
 
 
 Pojarkova AI, in Schischkin & Bobrov, Flora URSS. 18: 55. 1952.

External links 
 Flora of China
 Flora Republica Popularis Sinicae
 Tropicos, see also Section Tsutsusi 
 

Tsutsusi
Plant subsections